William Prendergast may refer to:
 William Prendergast (general), United States Army general
 William A. Prendergast, American businessman and politician from New York
 Sir William Prendergast (died 1333), knight who fought in the Wars of Scottish Independence
 William Christopher Dowling Prendergast, British medical doctor